Mulkeytown is an unincorporated and census-designated place in Franklin County, Illinois, United States. As of the 2010 census it had a population of 175.

Geography

Demographics

As of the 2010 census, its population was 175. The racial makeup was 99.4% white and 0.6% Asian. 
As of 2014 the median age of residents was 53.9

History

Centennial and sesquicentennial farms
Centennial and sesquicentennial farms are those family farms that have been held within a family for more than 100 or 150 years.
Davis - 1848
Greenwood - 1854
Berner - 1871

Education
Mulkeytown Grade School (closed 1987 and consolidated with Christopher Elementary School) - Now re-purposed as the West Franklin Historical District and Genealogical Society.
Christopher Unit School District #99
Rend Lake College
John A. Logan College
Southern Illinois University Carbondale

Religious organizations
 Greenwood Methodist Church
 Minor Church of Christ
 Mulkeytown Christian Church - (Est. 1818)  
 Mulkeytown Baptist Church

Cemeteries
Cook Cemetery 
Greenwood Cemetery 
Mulkeytown Cemetery 
Naylor Cemetery 
Old Mulkeytown Cemetery 
Reed-Kirpatrick Cemetery 
Ward Cemetery

Historical
West Franklin Historical Museum 
Silkwood Inn Museum

Notable people
 Snyder Solomon Kirkpatrick (b. February 21, 1848; d. April 5, 1909) - Attorney, U.S. Representative from Kansas, Kansas State House of Representatives
 James F. Rea - Illinois state legislator

References

1818 establishments in Illinois Territory
Census-designated places in Franklin County, Illinois
Census-designated places in Illinois
Populated places established in 1818
Pre-statehood history of Illinois
Populated places in Southern Illinois
Unincorporated communities in Illinois